João Gabriel da Silva (born 4 July 1984) is a retired Brazilian football midfielder.

References

External links
Profile at Soccerway
Profile at Eurosport

1984 births
Living people
Brazilian footballers
Association football midfielders
Brazilian expatriate footballers
Brazilian expatriate sportspeople in Croatia
Expatriate footballers in Croatia
Brazilian expatriate sportspeople in Slovenia
Expatriate footballers in Slovenia
Brazilian expatriate sportspeople in Malta
Expatriate footballers in Malta
Brazilian expatriate sportspeople in Austria
Expatriate footballers in Austria
NK Solin players
HNK Šibenik players
NK Primorje players
NK Drava Ptuj players
NK Olimpija Ljubljana (2005) players
NK Maribor players
NK Nafta Lendava players
Valletta F.C. players
Qormi F.C. players
Pietà Hotspurs F.C. players
Croatian Football League players
Slovenian PrvaLiga players
Maltese Premier League players